or Xieheyu is either of two pidginized languages, one Japanese-based and one Mandarin-based, that were spoken in Manchukuo in the 1930s and 1940s.

Description 

The term Kyowa-go/Xieheyu is derived from the Manchukuo state motto "Concord of Nationalities" ( mínzú xiéhe) promoted by the Pan-Asian Movement. The pidgin language resulted from the need of Japanese officials and soldiers and the Han and Manchu population that spoke mainly Chinese to communicate with each other. Manchukuo officials later dubbed the pidgin language "Kyowa-go" or "Xieheyu", meaning "Concord language". However, the Japanese also wanted to implement their own language in Manchukuo, saying that Japanese is a language which has a soul, so the language must be spoken correctly.

Kyowa-go/Xieheyu died out when Manchukuo fell to the Soviet Red Army in the last days of World War II. Documentation of the pidgin language is rare today.

It was also believed that many of the expressions of Chinese characters in manga (e.g. aru) are derived from Japanese-based Kyowa-go. Hence, it is typical of Chinese characters in anime shows to speak in that manner.

It was also believed that many of the expressions of Japanese characters in movies set in the Second Sino-Japanese War (e.g. ) are derived from Mandarin-based Xieheyu. Hence, it is typical of Japanese characters in movies shows to speak in that manner.

The Japanese were also known to use pidgin languages in Japan itself during the 19th and 20th centuries like Yokohama Pidgin Japanese.

Examples of Japanese-based Kyowa-go 

Kyowa-go is characterized by a particle aru, omission of some particles, and many loan-words from Mandarin.

 Original Japanese:   meaning "I am a Japanese".

 Original Japanese:   meaning "Your daughter is beautiful"

 Original Japanese:   meaning "There is no chair for you"

 Exclamation of surprise from Chinese.

Examples of Mandarin-based Xieheyu 

Xieheyu sometimes uses subject–object–verb, the normal Japanese word order, which is different from Mandarin.

See also 
 Creole language
 Empire of Japan
 Pseudo-Chinese

References 

 
 
 
 

Japanese-based pidgins and creoles
Japanese language
Chinese-based pidgins and creoles
Languages of China
Manchuria
Languages attested from the 1930s
Languages extinct in the 1940s
Languages in Manchukuo